Kim Hye-suk (born 15 August 1946) is a South Korean speed skater. She competed in two events at the 1964 Winter Olympics.

References

1946 births
Living people
South Korean female speed skaters
Olympic speed skaters of South Korea
Speed skaters at the 1964 Winter Olympics
20th-century South Korean women